James Duncanson (13 October 1919 – 1 September 1996) was a professional football striker who played for Rangers, St Mirren and Stranraer. His Rangers career started during World War II, and lasted until 1950, winning a total of 23 medals with the club.

Duncanson achieved a number of records for Rangers: he is the clubs' third-top all time scorer (with 22 goals) against rivals Celtic, behind R.C. Hamilton and Ally McCoist, he scored Rangers' 4000th league goal as part of a hat-trick in a match against Dundee at Dens Park on Christmas Day 1947, and he scored the first hat-trick in an Old Firm match for Rangers in the 20th century.

In total he made 302 appearances for Rangers (162 of which are unofficial as they took place during World War II), scoring 147 goals (88 wartime). He won the league twice for Rangers, as well as three Scottish Cups and two League Cups. He was capped once for Scotland, as well as on two occasions during the war. After retiring from football, Duncanson remained a fervent Rangers supporter and was regularly seen at Ibrox as a spectator.

References

External links
 
 

1919 births
1996 deaths
Scottish footballers
Association football forwards
Rangers F.C. players
St Mirren F.C. players
Stranraer F.C. players
Scotland international footballers
Scotland wartime international footballers
Scottish Football League players
Scottish Football League representative players
People from Dennistoun
Footballers from Glasgow
Place of death missing